Or Thora Synagogue may refer to:

 Or Thora Synagogue (Tunis)
 Or Thora Synagogue (Marseille)